Groveton High School may refer to:

Groveton High School (New Hampshire) — Groveton, New Hampshire
Groveton High School (Texas) — Groveton, Texas
West Potomac High School (formerly Groveton High School) — Alexandria, Virginia

See also:
Grovetown High School